Events of the year 2023 in the United Kingdom.

Incumbents 
 Monarch – Charles III
 Prime Minister – Rishi Sunak (Conservative)
 Parliament – 58th

Events

January 
 1 January – A visit by Thor the Walrus to Scarborough harbour, North Yorkshire overnight on New Year's Eve results in the town's New Year fireworks celebrations being cancelled to let the walrus rest for his journey to the Arctic. He was previously spotted at Pagham Harbour, Calshot, Hampshire in December 2022.
 2 January
 Three people are killed by a fire at the New County Hotel in Perth, Scotland.
 Thor the Walrus makes an appearance in Blyth, Northumberland.
 3 January – 40,000 railway workers who are members of the RMT union hold the first of two 48-hour strikes this week, severely disrupting train services in England, Scotland, and Wales.
 4 January – The Crown Dependency of Jersey will issue Jersey Post stamps featuring the Royal cypher of King Charles III from 5 January.
 5 January
 The government confirms it will not go ahead with a plan to privatise Channel 4.
 The Met Office confirms that 2022 was the UK's warmest year since records began in 1884, with an average annual temperature above  for the first time.
 BioNTech announces a strategic partnership with the UK government to provide up to 10,000 patients with personalised mRNA cancer immunotherapies by 2030.
 6 January – COVID-19 in the UK: Almost three million people were infected with COVID-19 over the Christmas period (the highest since July 2022), the  latest Office for National Statistics data suggests, with one in 20 having the virus in England, one in 18 in Wales, one in 25 in Scotland and one in 16 in Northern Ireland. XBB.1.5, the new Omicron variant of the virus, is believed to be responsible for one in 200 infections in the UK.
 8 January 
 The Crown Dependency of the Isle of Man issues Post Office stamps featuring the Royal cypher of King Charles III.
ITV1 broadcasts a 95-minute interview with Prince Harry ahead of the release of his memoirs, Spare.
 10 January
 The UK government publishes the Strikes (Minimum Service Levels) Bill 2023, designed to require public sector organisations to provide a minimum service when their unions vote to strike.
 Prince Harry's controversial memoir Spare is released, becoming "the fastest selling non-fiction book of all time" on the date of its release. 
 11 January – Andrew Bridgen has the whip suspended by the Conservative Party after he spread misinformation about COVID-19 and compared vaccination to the Holocaust.
 12 January – Heavy rain and strong winds cause floods and travel disruption in parts of the UK, with over 60 flood warnings issued in England, 19 in Wales and 2 in Scotland.
 13 January
 Figures indicate the UK economy unexpectedly grew by 0.1% in November 2022, potentially avoiding a long recession.
 Medical experts criticise the BBC for an interview with Aseem Malhotra who claims that mRNA vaccines may have been responsible for thousands of excess deaths.
 Manchester City footballer Benjamin Mendy is cleared on six counts of rape and one count of sexual assault against four young women, but faces a retrial on two counts the jury could not reach verdicts on.
 COVID-19 in the UK: The latest Office for National Statistics data indicates COVID-19 cases were falling in England and Wales in the week up to 30 December 2022, with cases continuing to increase in Scotland; the picture was unclear for Northern Ireland. In England, an estimated 2,189,300 people were thought to have tested positive for COVID-19. 
 14 January
 Four women and two children are injured in a drive-by mass shooting close to a Catholic church in Euston Road, Euston, Central London. A 22-year-old man is arrested two days later on suspicion of attempted murder.
 Amid recent heavy rain, more than 100 flood warnings by the Environment Agency remain in place across the country, with hundreds of homes damaged and many left without power.
 Rishi Sunak confirms that the UK will send 14 Challenger 2 tanks to Ukraine to boost its war effort.
 16 January
 Serving Metropolitan Police officer David Carrick admits over 40 offences including more than 20 rapes against 12 women over two decades.
 The National Education Union announces that teachers in England and Wales will strike on seven dates during February and March after members voted in favour of strike action. National strikes will be held on 1 and 15 February, and 15 March, as well as four days of regional strikes.
 The UK government announces it will block the Gender Recognition Reform (Scotland) Bill, the first time that the UK government has used powers to block a Scottish law. UK ministers say the draft law would "conflict with equality protections applying across Great Britain".
 The Royal College of Nursing announces a further two nurses' strikes for 6 and 7 February, described as the biggest so far.
 MPs vote 309–249 in favour of the Strikes (Minimum Service Levels) Bill 2023, which now moves to the committee stage.
 18 January
 The ONS reports that inflation dropped for the second month running, to 10.5% in December, from 10.7% the previous month. At the two extremes of the ONS's list of "notable movements" that contribute to the overall figure, 'clothing and footwear' price inflation dropped from 7.5% to 6.4%, 'furniture and household goods' dropped from 10.8% to 9.8%, 'food and non-alcoholic beverages' rose from 16.5% to 16.9%, and 'restaurants and hotels' rose from 10.2% to 11.4%.
 BBC News reports that Church of England bishops will not give their backing to a change in teaching that would allow them to marry same-sex couples, but the Church will offer "prayers of dedication, thanksgiving or God's blessing" to gay couples.
 19 January – Prime Minister Rishi Sunak apologises for taking his seat belt off in a moving car to film a social media clip. Lancashire Police later say they are "looking into" the incident. He is issued with a fixed-penalty notice the following day.
 20 January
 The Church of England issues an apology for the "shameful" times it has "rejected or excluded" LGBTQ+ people, while Archbishop of Canterbury Justin Welby says he supports the changes that allow blessings to be offered to gay couples, but says he will not personally use them because he has a "responsibility to the whole communion".
 The High Court awards £39m in damages against Frimley Health NHS Foundation Trust in Surrey to a girl whose limbs were amputated after she was wrongly diagnosed.
 COVID-19 in the UK: ONS data for the week up to 10 January indicates that COVID-19 infections have continued to fall in England and Wales, with one in 40 people (an estimated 2.6% of the population) testing positive for the virus.
 22 January – Labour's chairwoman, Anneliese Dodds writes to Daniel Greenberg, the Parliamentary Commissioner for Standards, requesting "an urgent investigation" into claims that Richard Sharp, the Chairman of the BBC, helped former Prime Minister Boris Johnson secure a loan guarantee weeks before Johnson recommended him for the BBC chairmanship.
 23 January
 Prime Minister Rishi Sunak asks his Independent Adviser on Ministers' Interests to investigate allegations that, during his time as Chancellor of the Exchequer, Conservative Party Chairman Nadhim Zahawi paid a penalty to HM Revenue and Customs in relation to previously unpaid tax.
 William Shawcross, the Commissioner for Public Appointments, begins a review into the process of hiring Chairman of the BBC Richard Sharp following allegations he helped then-PM Boris Johnson secure a loan guarantee shortly before his appointment. Johnson dismisses the claims, saying Sharp had no knowledge of his finances. Sharp says that although he contacted Cabinet Secretary Simon Case in December 2020 about the offer of a loan to Johnson, he was not involved in discussions.
 National Grid's Demand Flexibility Service begins in an attempt to avoid a power blackout. Between 5:00pm and 6:00pm, people in England, Scotland and Wales who have signed up to the scheme are asked to use less electricity, and will be paid by their energy companies for doing so.
 Salisbury Crown Court in Wiltshire convicts Lawangeen Abdulrahimzai of a murder he committed in Bournemouth, Dorset, in 2022.
 25 January
 The first ever strike by UK employees of Amazon is held. 300 staff at a Coventry warehouse stage a one-day walk out, in a dispute over pay and conditions.
 Lawangeen Abdulrahimzai is sentenced to life imprisonment.
 26 January – Nicola Sturgeon confirms that Isla Bryson, a trans woman recently convicted of raping two women before her transition, has been moved from Cornton Vale women's prison to HMP Edinburgh men's prison, sparking debate about the Gender Recognition Reform (Scotland) Bill.
 27 January
 Nicola Bulley disappears mysteriously whilst walking her dog beside the River Wyre.
 COVID-19 in the UK: Data released by the Office for National Statistics for the week ending 17 January indicate overall cases have continued to fall. In England, the estimated number of people testing positive for COVID-19 was 906,300 (roughly 1.62% of the population or 1 in 60 people).
 28 January
 Airline Flybe cancels all flights to and from the UK after going into administration.
 Charity Super.Mkt, billed as the UK's first multi-charity store and selling items supplied by ten charities, opens at London's Brent Cross Shopping Centre.
 29 January
 Conservative Party Chairman Nadhim Zahawi is sacked by Rishi Sunak over "a serious breach of the Ministerial Code" relating to the investigation into his tax affairs, conducted on 23 January.
 The Scottish Prison Service pauses the movement of all transgender prisoners while it carries out an "urgent review" into the transgender cases held in its custody.
 30 January
 William Shawcross, the commissioner for public appointments, steps back from the planned investigation into how Richard Sharp got the job as BBC chairman because of previous contact between them. Another investigator will be appointed to take on the inquiry.
 Members of the Fire Brigades Union vote to take strike action over pay.

February 
 1 February – An estimated 475,000 workers go on strike, the single biggest day of industrial action for more than a decade, in disputes over pay and conditions. This includes 200,000 teachers, 100,000 civil servants including border force workers, university lecturers, security guards, and train drivers. The government warns the public to expect "significant disruption".
 2 February
 The Bank of England raises its baseline interest rate from 3.5 to 4%, the highest level in 14 years.
 The energy regulator Ofgem asks energy companies to suspend the forced installation of prepayment meters following an investigation by The Times which showed agents working for British Gas breaking into the homes of vulnerable customers to install the meters.
 3 February
 Gary Glitter is freed from prison after serving half of a 16-year jail term for attempted rape, four counts of indecent assault and one of having sex with a girl under 13.
 COVID-19 in the UK: Office for National Statistics data for the week up to 24 January indicates that COVID-19 cases continue to fall, with an estimated 1 in 70 people (1.42% of the population) testing positive for the virus in England over that time.
 5 February
 Emma Pattinson, the head of Epsom College in Surrey, is found dead along with her husband and seven-year-old daughter in a property at the school. Police suspect a murder-suicide by gunshot.
 In a move seen as marking her return to political life, former Prime Minister Liz Truss writes an article for The Sunday Telegraph in which she says her economic agenda was never given a "realistic chance".
 6 February
 2022–2023 National Health Service strikes: Ambulance staff and nurses walk out, with further disruption to follow in the week, in what is expected to be the biggest-ever round of NHS strikes.
 Foreign Secretary James Cleverly offers his condolences to victims of the 7.8 magnitude Turkey–Syria earthquake and says the UK is deploying emergency response teams, including 76 search and rescue specialists, equipment and rescue dogs. The government issues an urgent warning to British travellers and holidaymakers who may be in or planning to visit the region.
 7 February
 Former Met Police officer David Carrick, one of the UK's most prolific sex offenders, is sentenced at Southwark Crown Court to 36 life sentences with a minimum term of 30 years in prison.
 Sunak performs a cabinet reshuffle. Greg Hands is named as the new Conservative Party chairman; Grant Shapps becomes the Secretary of State for Energy, Security and Net Zero in a newly-formed department; Kemi Badenoch is appointed as the first Secretary of State at the newly-created Department for Business and Trade, with continued responsibility as equalities minister.
 8 February
 Ukraine's President Volodymyr Zelensky addresses a joint session of Parliament during his first visit to the UK since Russia invaded his country. He later visits Buckingham Palace for a meeting with the King.
 Former Labour MP Jared O'Mara, who submitted fake expense claims to fund his cocaine habit, is convicted of fraud. The following day, he is sentenced to four years in prison.
 Royal Mail unveils a new stamp design that will be available from 4 April, featuring an image of the unadorned head of King Charles III.
 9 February
 The UK commits additional funding to help the victims of the earthquake in Turkey and Syria.
 2023 West Lancashire by-election: Labour hold the seat with a large vote share of 62.3%, an increase of 10.3%. Ashley Dalton is the new MP.
 In a radio interview before his appointment as Deputy Chairman of the Conservative Party, Lee Anderson says he will support the return of capital punishment where the perpetrators are clearly identifiable. Prime Minister Rishi Sunak says neither he nor the government shares Anderson's stance.
 10 February
 Chancellor Jeremy Hunt tells the BBC households are unlikely to receive extra help with their energy bills from April 2023, as he does not think the government has the "headroom to make a major new initiative to help people".
 Data released by the Office for National Statistics indicates the UK narrowly avoided a recession at the end of 2022 following zero percent growth during October to December. This is also despite a fall in output of 0.5% during December due to strike action being staged prior to Christmas.
 Coronation of Charles III and Camilla
 Buckingham Palace unveils the official Coronation logo, designed by Sir Jony Ive.
 A ballot offering 10,000 free tickets to the Coronation concert at Windsor Castle on 7 May opens.
 COVID-19 in the UK: Data from the Office for National Statistics for the week ending 31 January indicates COVID-19 cases have risen in England for the first time in 2023, with 1.02 million cases, an increase of 8% from 941,800 the previous week. Data for Scotland and Wales is less clear.
 11 February – The body of Brianna Ghey, a 16-year-old teenage transgender girl is found in Warrington Park in Cheshire, England. Two teenagers, a boy and a girl, both 15-years-old are arrested on suspicion of her murder.
 13 February – Former Metropolitan Police officer Wayne Couzens pleads guilty to three counts of indecent exposure during a hearing at the Old Bailey, including one committed four days before he killed Sarah Everard in 2021.
 14 February – The Welsh government cancels all major road building projects in Wales, including the proposed Third Menai Crossing, amid concerns about the environment.
 15 February
 Inflation falls for the third month in a row, from 10.5% to 10.1%. This is mainly due to a decrease in fuel, restaurant, and hotel prices, according to the ONS. Food inflation remains at 16.7%. Pay, excluding bonuses,  rose at an annual pace of 6.7% from October to December 2022, and when inflation is taken into account, regular pay fell by 2.5%.
 Nicola Sturgeon announces her resignation as First Minister of Scotland and Leader of the Scottish National Party after eight years in the role; she will stay on until her successor has been elected.
 Two teenagers are charged with murder in relation to the death of Brianna Ghey.
 16 February – The RMT announce four new days of train strikes for 16, 18 and 30 March, and 1 April.
 17 February
 David Ballantyne Smith, a former security guard at the British embassy in Berlin who attempted to sell confidential information to the Russians, is sentenced to 13 years imprisonment following a trial at the Old Bailey.
 Storm Otto strikes Scotland and parts of northern England, leaving around 30,000 homes without power and forcing a number of schools to close.
COVID-19 in the UK: Office for National Statistics data for the week up to 7 February indicates that COVID-19 cases continued to increase in England, Wales and Scotland, but decreased in Northern Ireland. In England, In England it is estimated that 1,054,200 people had COVID-19, equating to 1.88% of the population, or around 1 in 55 people.
 18 February – Coronation of Charles III and Camilla: Twelve new pieces of music are commissioned by the King for his coronation, including a composition by Andrew Lloyd Webber. Part of the service will also be in Welsh, it is confirmed.
 19 February – Police searching for Nicola Bulley, missing since 27 January, say they have found a body in the River Wyre.
 20 February
Prime Minister Rishi Sunak criticises the rewriting of Roald Dahl's books after they were updated to remove references that could be considered offensive, such as characters being fat.
Junior doctors in England vote to strike in their ongoing dispute for a 26% pay rise, and will stage a 72-hour walkout. The BMA maintains junior doctors' pay has been cut by 26% since 2008 after inflation is considered.
Lancashire Police confirm the body found in the River Wyre the previous day is that of Nicola Bulley.
 Coronation of Charles III and Camilla
 The Crown Dependency of the Isle of Man, announce a special collection of commemorative 50 pence coins will be issued from March.
 21 February
The UK Government announces that it had a budget surplus in January, with £5bn more in revenue than predicted. 
A planned 48-hour strike by nurses in England is called off to allow the Royal College of Nursing and Department of Health and Social Care to enter into renewed negotiations.
The broadcasting regulator Ofcom writes to both ITV News and Sky News to ask them for an explanation of their actions following complaints made by the family of Nicola Bulley. Her family had been contacted by both outlets despite asking for privacy.
Asda and Morrisons announce they are limiting the sale of some fruit and vegetable products, such as tomatoes, peppers and cucumbers, because of a shortage caused by severe weather in Spain and North Africa which has affected harvests.
The UK Government recommends a 3.5% pay rise for public sector workers in England, below the rate of inflation.
 22 February
Shamima Begum loses her legal challenge to overturn the decision to remove her UK citizenship.
Tesco and Aldi follow Asda and Morrisons by introducing limits on the purchase of some fruit and vegetables.
Lancashire Police and Crime Commissioner Andrew Snowden commissions the College of Policing to review the force's investigation into the disappearance of Nicola Bulley, including the release of information about her private life.
DCI John Caldwell, an off duty Police Service of Northern Ireland officer, is injured in Omagh after being shot by suspected New IRA gunman.
 23 February
Labour leader Sir Keir Starmer outlines the five key issues that his party will focus on during the run up to the next general election: higher economic growth, clean energy, improving the NHS, reforming the justice system, and raising education standards.
Environment Secretary Therese Coffey, commenting on the vegetable shortage, tells MPs "we anticipate the situation will last about another two to four weeks".
Three men are arrested in relation to the previous evening's shooting of DCI John Caldwell.
 24 February 
The British Medical Association announces that junior doctors in England will begin a three-day strike on 13 March.
An earthquake measuring 3.7 magnitude strikes Brynmawr, Blaenau Gwent at 11.59pm.
COVID-19 in the UK: Office for National Statistics data for the week up to 14 February indicates COVID-19 cases continued to rise in England, Scotland and Wales, but remained uncertain in Northern Ireland. In England, the estimated number of people testing positive for COVID-19 was 1,223,000 (or 2.18% of the population and around 1 in 45 people).
 27 February
Ofgem announces a 23% decrease in the quarterly price cap on the amount suppliers can charge for household energy bills, from £4,279 to £3,280 – a £999 drop, to apply from April 2023.
Sunak and President of the European Commission Ursula von der Leyen announce a new agreement concerning movement of goods to/from Northern Ireland, named the Windsor Framework.
Lidl becomes the latest UK food retailer to limit the sale of some fruit and vegetables due to an ongoing shortage.
New regulations come into force in England and Wales banning transgender women who still have male genitalia, or those who are sex offenders, from being sent to women's prisons.
 28 February 
Sunak meets businesses and their employees in Belfast, to secure support for his new agreement with the EU. He tells them that being in both the single market and the UK makes Northern Ireland the "world's most exciting economic zone" and "an incredibly attractive place to invest."
Transgender rapist Isla Bryson is sentenced to eight years in prison with a further three years supervision.
Sainsbury's announces the closure of two Argos depots over the next three years, with the loss of 1,400 jobs.
Zholia Alemi, who faked a medical degree certificate from the University of Auckland to work as a psychiatrist for two decades, is sentenced to seven years in prison following a trial at Manchester Crown Court.
Members of the National Union of Journalists working for the BBC regional service in England vote to take strike action over planned cuts to BBC Local Radio. A 24-hour strike is scheduled for 15 March to coincide with Budget Day.

March
 1 March
 COVID-19 in the UK: WhatsApp messages leaked to the Daily Telegraph are reported as suggesting former Health Secretary Matt Hancock chose to ignore advice from experts in April 2020 that there should be "testing of all going into care homes". A spokesman for Hancock says "These stolen messages have been doctored to create a false story that Matt rejected clinical advice on care home testing”.
A Freedom of Information request by BBC News reveals that 729 sex offenders who were under supervision disappeared off the radar in a three year period from 2019 to the end of 2021.
 2 March
COVID-19 in the UK: The Daily Telegraph publishes more of Matt Hancock's WhatsApp exchanges, this time with former Education Secretary Gavin Williamson in December 2020, when a debate into whether schools should reopen following the Christmas holiday was taking place. The leaked messages suggest Hancock favoured school closures, while Williamson was more hesitant. Hancock, who worked alongside journalist Isabel Oakeshott to co-author a book, describes the release of the messages as a "massive betrayal and breach of trust". In response, Oakeshott says she released the messages because she believed doing so was in the "public interest".
Sir Keir Starmer unveils Sue Gray, who led the investigation into the Partygate scandal, as Labour's new Chief of Staff, sparking concern among some Conservative MPs about her impartiality.
The public inquiry into the 2017 Manchester Arena bombing finds that MI5 missed a significant chance to take action that might have stopped the attack when they failed to obtain intelligence that would have led them to follow Salman Abedi to the car where he was storing explosives. Ken McCallum, the director-general of MI5, says he regrets that the intelligence was missed.
 3 March
COVID-19 in the UK: Office for National Statistics data for the week up to 21 February indicates that COVID-19 infections were increasing in England and Wales, but decreasing in Northern Ireland, while the situation in Scotland was uncertain. In England, the number of people testing positive for COVID-19 was estimated to be 1,298,600 (roughly 2.31% of the population around 1 in 45).
The latest leaked WhatsApp messages published by the Daily Telegraph are reported as appearing to show former Health Secretary Matt Hancock and Cabinet Secretary Simon Case joking about locking people in quarantine hotels.
The Commons Select Committee of Privileges finds that former Prime Minister Boris Johnson may have misled Parliament over the Partygate scandal after evidence suggested breaches of COVID-19 rules would have been "obvious" to him. In response Johnson says that none of the evidence shows he "knowingly" misled parliament, and that "it is clear from this report that I have not committed any contempt of parliament".
Buckingham Palace announces the first state visit to be made by Charles III and Camilla as King and Queen Consort; they will travel to France and Germany between 26 and 31 March.
 4 March 
Leaked WhatsApp messages published by the Daily Telegraph indicate, according to BBC News who have not seen or verified the messages, that Matt Hancock and his staff deliberated over whether or not he had broken COVID-19 regulations after pictures of him kissing his aide, Gina Coladangelo, were published by The Sun newspaper. In another conversation, the messages show, BBC News also says, Hancock criticising the Eat Out to Help Out scheme for "causing problems" in areas where there were a nigh number of COVID-19 cases.
Typhoon jets are scrambled from RAF Coningsby in Lincolnshire to help escort a civilian plane en route from Iceland to Kenya following a loss of communication caused by an equipment malfunction. A sonic boom is heard over parts of England after the jets are allowed to fly at supersonic speed.
 5 March
Train fares in England and Wales are increased by up to 5.9%, representing the largest increase in more than a decade.   
News outlets including BBC News, Sky News and The Independent (who have not verified the messages) report that further WhatsApp messages published by The Telegraph appear to show discussions about how and when the government should reveal details of the Kent variant in order to ensure people would comply with COVID-19 regulations. The news outlets also say Hancock appears to suggest they should "frighten the pants off everyone", while in another conversation, head of the civil service Simon Case suggests the "fear/guilt factor" is an important element of the government's messaging. The Telegraph also reports messages showing ministers and civil servants discussing "[getting] heavy with the police" to enforce lockdown measures with senior police officers being brought into Number 10 to be told to be stricter with the public.
Speaking to the Mail on Sunday, Sunak says that migrants arriving in the UK on small boats will be prevented from seeking asylum under proposed new legislation to be brought before Parliament.
 6 March 
Media regulator Ofcom finds that a GB News programme which aired on 21 April 2022 was in breach of broadcasting rules, as it presented misinformation on COVID-19 and vaccines.
Members of the Fire Brigades Union vote to accept a 7% pay rise backdated to July 2022, and worth 5% from July 2023, meaning they will not strike.
Wayne Couzens is sentenced to 19 months imprisonment after pleading guilty to three counts of indecent exposure in the months prior to the kidnap and murder of Sarah Everard.
A parole hearing for Charles Bronson, one of the UK's longest serving prisoners, is held at the Royal Courts of Justice. It is the second such hearing to be held in public.
The Telegraph publishes messages that are reported to have been exchanged between Allan Nixon, a parliamentary Advisor and Hancock from November 2020 in which they discuss threatening to cancel projects in MPs constituencies if MPs do not support the local lockdown tiers legislation. It is also reported that as part of a strategy aimed at trying to stop MPs from rebelling against the legislation, party whips compiled a spreadsheet of 95 MPs who disagreed with this policy and the reasons for them disagreeing; these related to lack of parliamentary scrutiny, economic harm, harms to hospital, absence of cost benefit analysis and the policy being "unconservative".
 7 March 
A cold snap from the Arctic hits the UK, causing snowfall in Scotland and parts of northern England. Two coal fire power stations are also reactivated amid concerns about the strain the cold snap could cause on the National Grid. 
Home Secretary Suella Braverman introduces the Illegal Migration Bill into the House of Commons, which is designed to stop migrants arriving in the UK by boat. The legislation proposes to detain and remove those from the UK who arrive by illegal means, as well as blocking them from returning.  
COVID-19 in the UK: The Joint Committee on Vaccination and Immunisation announces that everyone over 75, care-home residents and anyone considered to be extremely vulnerable aged five and over will be offered a spring COVID-19 booster vaccine. Vaccinations will begin in March in Scotland, early April in England and Wales, and mid-April in Northern Ireland.
RMT staff working for Network Rail call off a strike planned for 16 March after being given a fresh pay offer.
 8 March 
The UK experiences its coldest March night since 2010, with −15.2°C recorded in Kinbrace, Scotland, dipping even further to −15.4°C by the morning. The Health Security Agency issues a level 3 cold alert for the whole of England, while more than 100 schools across Wales are closed due to snow.
The National Institute for Health and Care Excellence (NICE) approves the use of the weight loss drug semaglutide (marketed as Wegovy) by the NHS in England.
 9 March
The UK government announces a two-year delay in the construction of the Birmingham to Crewe leg of HS2 in order to save costs.
Asda and Morrisons lift their restrictions on the sale of fresh produce.
Following a trial at the High Court in Aberdeen, retired research scientist Christopher Harrison, 82, is convicted of the murder of his ex-wife, Brenda Page, in 1978.
 10 March 
The UK economy grew by 0.3% in January 2023, official figures show, much more than the 0.1% that was predicted by economists.  
The King bestows the title of Duke of Edinburgh on his younger brother, Prince Edward.
Prime Minister Rishi Sunak attends a summit in Paris with French President Emmanuel Macron and announces the UK will give France £500m over three years to help the UK stop the influx of migrants arriving by boat. 
The BBC tells Gary Lineker he cannot present BBC One's Match of the Day until an agreement can be reached over his social media use.
COVID-19 in the UK: Office for National Statistics data for the week ending 28 February indicates COVID-19 cases are rising in Scotland, but the picture is unclear in the rest of the UK. In England, the number of people testing positive for COVID-19 was estimated to be 1,333,400, equating to 2.38% of the population, or around 1 in 40 people. In Scotland, the figure was 128,400, equating to 2.44% of the population or around 1 in 40 people.
 11 March
The BBC apologises for 'limited' sports broadcasts, as a growing number of TV and radio presenters drop out of key programmes in support of Gary Lineker, amid an ongoing debate over impartiality.
The Bank of England announces that the UK arm of Silicon Valley Bank is to enter insolvency, following the demise of its US parent, the largest banking collapse since the 2007–2008 financial crisis. Many UK tech startups are prevented from accessing cash to pay staff.
 12 March – The UK government announces that charges for prepayment energy meters are to be brought into line with those for customers paying by direct debit from 1 July, saving an average of £45 per year.
 13 March
HSBC agrees to buy the UK arm of Silicon Valley Bank, allowing UK tech firms and customers to access money and services as normal.
Gary Lineker is allowed to return to presenting football, as the BBC announces an independent review of its social media guidelines. Director General Tim Davie acknowledges there are "grey areas" and says enforcing impartiality is a "difficult balancing act."
Disgraced former pop star Gary Glitter is recalled to prison after breaching his licence conditions.
Prime Minister Rishi Sunak announces an extra £5bn of government spending for UK defence over the coming two years.
 14 March – Following a trial at Preston Crown Court, Eleanor Williams is sentenced to eight-and-a-half years in prison after falsely accusing several men of rape and claiming to have been trafficked by an Asian grooming gang.
 15 March
Chancellor of the Exchequer Jeremy Hunt presents the 2023 United Kingdom budget to the House of Commons, and says that the UK will avoid going into recession in 2023.
Teachers, junior doctors, civil servants and Tube drivers stage a mass walkout, amid ongoing concerns regarding pay, jobs, pensions and working conditions.
 16 March
NHS staff in England, including nurses and ambulance staff, are offered a 5% pay rise from April along with a one-off payment of £1,655 to cover backdated pay. The offer does not include doctors, who are on a different contract.  
The government announces that TikTok is to be banned on electronic devices used by ministers and other employees, amid security concerns relating to the Chinese-owned app's handling of user data.
Scientists identify a gene variant that is known to increases the risk of breast and ovarian cancer, and trace it to people with Orkney Island heritage, more specifically those with ancestry on the island of Westray.
 18 March – Peter Murrell resigns as chairman of the Scottish National Party amid a row over party membership.
 19 March – The UK government launches the Emergency Alerts service, a service to send text alerts to mobile phones in a situation where it is perceived there is an immediate risk to life.

Predicted and scheduled events 
 27 March – The result of the 2023 Scottish National Party leadership election to replace Nicola Sturgeon is expected.
 3 April – The cost of a first class stamp is set to rise by 15p to £1.10, and a second class stamp by 7p to 75p.  
 23 April – The Emergency Alerts service is scheduled to be tested by the UK government. 
 4 May – 2023 United Kingdom local elections
 6 May – Coronation of Charles III and Camilla in Westminster Abbey, London.
 13 May – Eurovision Song Contest 2023 at the Liverpool Arena
 18 May – 2023 Northern Ireland local elections
 20 July – 2023 FIFA Women's World Cup in Australia and New Zealand. England are to compete.
 8 September – 2023 Rugby World Cup in France. England, Wales and Scotland are to compete, as are Ireland which includes Northern Ireland.
 October – 2023 Cricket World Cup in India. England are scheduled to compete.

Deaths 
The following notable deaths of British people occurred in 2023. Names are reported under the date of death, in alphabetical order. A typical entry reports information in the following sequence:
 Name, age, citizenship at birth, nationality (in addition to British), or/and home nation, what subject was noted for, birth year, cause of death (if known), and reference.

January 
 
 
 

 1 January – Frank McGarvey, Scottish footballer (St Mirren, Celtic, national team) (b. 1956), pancreatic cancer.
 2 January – Andrew Downes, 72, English classical composer.
 3 January
 Roger Kean, British magazine publisher (Crash, Zzap!64), co-founder of Newsfield.
 Alan Rankine, 64, Scottish musician (The Associates) (b. 1958) (death announced on this date)
 4 January – Wyllie Longmore, 82, Jamanican-born British actor (Coronation Street, Love Actually), cancer.
 5 January
 Thomas Stonor, 7th Baron Camoys, 82, British banker and peer, lord chamberlain (1998–2000).
 David Gold, 86, British retailer, publisher (Gold Star Publications), and football executive, chairman of West Ham United (since 2010).
 Fay Weldon, 91, British author (The Life and Loves of a She-Devil, Puffball, The Cloning of Joanna May), essayist and playwright.
 7 January – Ken Scotland, 86, Scottish rugby union player (Leicester Tigers, national team) and cricketer (national team), cancer.
 8 January – Ray Middleton, 86, British Olympic racewalker (1964), respiratory failure.
 9 January – David Duckham, 76, English rugby union player (Coventry, national team).
 10 January – Jeff Beck, 78, English rock guitarist (The Yardbirds, The Jeff Beck Group, Beck, Bogert & Appice), bacterial meningitis.
 11 January
 Piers Haggard, 83, British film and television director (Pennies from Heaven, Quatermass, The Blood on Satan's Claw, The Fiendish Plot of Dr. Fu Manchu).
 Eli Ostreicher, 39, British-born American serial entrepreneur, motorcycle accident in Thailand.
 12 January
 Paul Johnson, 94, British journalist, historian and author (Modern Times: A History of the World from the 1920s to the 1980s, A History of the American People, A History of Christianity).
 Roy Pierpoint, 93, British racing driver, saloon car champion (1965).
 13 January – Marc Worth, 61, British fashion executive, co-founder of WGSN, heart attack.
 14 January
 Alireza Akbari, 61, Iranian-British politician and convicted spy, execution by hanging. (death announced on this date)
 Ronald Blythe, 100, English writer and columnist (Church Times).
 John Wickham, 73, British motor racing team owner (Spirit Racing).
 15 January – Bruce Gowers, 82, British television director (American Idol) and music video director ("Bohemian Rhapsody"), complications from acute respiratory infection.
 16 January
 John Bicourt, 77, British Olympic middle-distance runner (1972, 1976). (death announced on this date)
 Brian Tufano, 83, English cinematographer (Trainspotting, A Life Less Ordinary, Billy Elliot).
 17 January – Jonathan Raban, 80, British travel writer, critic, and novelist (Soft City, Waxwings, For Love & Money).
 19 January
 David Sutherland, 89, Scottish illustrator and comics artist (The Beano, Dennis the Menace and Gnasher, The Bash Street Kids).
 Peter Thomas, 78, English-Irish footballer (Waterford, Ireland national team).
 Anton Walkes, 25, English footballer (Portsmouth, Atlanta United, Charlotte FC), boat crash.
 22 January – Ian Black, 69, British journalist (The Guardian), and author (Israel's Secret Wars), complications from frontotemporal lobar degeneration.
 23 January – Fred Lindop, 84, British rugby league referee.
 27 January – Sylvia Syms, 89, English actress (Peak Practice, EastEnders).
 31 January – Alan Hurst, 77, British politician, MP for Braintree (1997–2005).

February

 2 February – Tim Quy, 61, British musician (Cardiacs).
 3 February – Robert Key, 77, English politician, Minister for Sport (1992–1993).
 5 February 
 Hilary Alexander, 77, New Zealand-born British fashion journalist (The Daily Telegraph).
 Robin Cocks, 84, British geologist.
 Phil Spalding, 65, English bassist, session musician.
 6 February
 Peter Allen, 76, English footballer (Leyton Orient, Millwall).
 Janet Anderson, 73, British politician, Minister for Film, Tourism and Broadcasting (1998–2001).
 Billy Thomson, 64, Scottish footballer (Partick Thistle, St Mirren, Dundee United, Clydebank, Motherwell, Rangers, Dundee, Scotland).
 7 February – Royden Wood, 92, English footballer (Leeds United).
 9 February – Dennis Lotis, 97, South African-born British singer and actor (It's a Wonderful World, The City of the Dead, What Every Woman Wants).
 10 February – Hugh Hudson, 86, English film director (Chariots of Fire, Greystoke: The Legend of Tarzan, Lord of the Apes, Revolution).
 12 February – Tony Lee, 75, English footballer (Bradford City, Darlington).
 13 February 
 Zia Mohyeddin, 91, British-Pakistani actor (Lawrence of Arabia, Immaculate Conception).
 Oliver Wood, 80, British cinematographer (Die Hard 2, Face/Off, The Bourne Identity).
 14 February – Christine Pritchard, 79, Welsh actress (Pobol y Cwm, Cara Fi).
 16 February 
 Kevin Bird, 70, English professional footballer (Mansfield Town, Huddersfield Town).
 Colin Dobson, 82, English professional footballer (Sheffield Wednesday, Huddersfield Town, Bristol Rovers).
 17 February – Lee Whitlock, 54, British actor (Shine On Harvey Moon, Cassandra's Dream, Sweeney Todd: The Demon Barber of Fleet Street).
 19 February 
 Dickie Davies, 94, British television sports presenter (World of Sport).
 Henry McDonald, 57, Northern Irish writer and journalist (The Guardian, The Observer).
 22 February – Philip Ziegler, 93, British biographer and historian.
 23 February 
 John Motson, 77, English football commentator (BBC Sport).
 Irving Wardle, 93, English theatre critic and writer.
 24 February – Sir Bernard Ingham, 90, British journalist and civil servant, Downing Street press secretary (1979–1990).
 25 February – Sir David Lumsden, 94, British musician and choirmaster.
 26 February
 Betty Boothroyd, Baroness Boothroyd, 93, British politician, first woman Speaker of the House of Commons (1992–2000).
 Jim Lewis, 88, racehorse owner (Best Mate).
 27 February 
 Tom McLeish, 60, British theoretical physicist.
 Sammy Winston, 44, English footballer (Leyton Orient).

March

 1 March – Allan McGraw, 83, Scottish football player (Morton, Hibernian) and manager.
 2 March – Steve Mackey, 56, English bassist, producer (Pulp).
 3 March
 Edwin A. Dawes, 97, British biochemist and magician.
 Christopher Fowler, 69, English novelist.
 Rita O'Hare, 80, Northern Irish political activist.
 5 March – Bob Goody, 71, British actor and writer (Smith and Goody, The Cook, the Thief, His Wife & Her Lover, Blue Heaven, The Borrowers).
 9 March – Mystic Meg, 80, British astrologer.
 11 March – Bill Tidy, 89, British cartoonist (The Cloggies, The Fosdyke Saga).
 13 March
 Simon Emmerson, 67, English record producer, guitarist, DJ, musical director, founder of (Afro Celt Sound System).
 Alan Jones, 77, Welsh footballer (Swansea City, Hereford United, Southport).
 14 March – Chris Shevlane, 80, Scottish footballer (Hearts, Celtic, Hibernian, Morton).
 16 March – Don Megson, 86, English footballer (Sheffield Wednesday, Bristol Rovers) and manager (Bristol Rovers, Bournemouth).

See also 
 Politics in the United Kingdom
 2020s in United Kingdom political history
 2023 in United Kingdom politics and government
 2023 in British music
 2023 in British television
 2023 in British radio
 List of British films of 2023

References 

 
United Kingdom
United Kingdom
Years of the 21st century in the United Kingdom